Bryndís Lára Hrafnkelsdóttir (born 11 January 1991) is an Icelandic footballer who plays for Víkingur Reykjavík. She debuted for the Icelandic national team in 2019.

Club career
Bryndís played for ÍBV from 2012 to 2016. After her stint in Vestmannaeyjar, she moved to Þór/KA in 2017 where she helped the team win the Icelandic championship the same year. After initially deciding to take a break from football, she returned to the field in April 2018 and played with Valur in the League Cup. A month later, she signed back við Þór/KA after its main goalkeeper, Helena Jónsdóttir, got injured. After Þór/KA signed goalkeepers Johanna Henriksson and Stephanie Bukovec, Bryndís was loaned to ÍBV. She returned to Þór/KA the following season but struggled with injuries. In June 2020, she signed with Valur.

In February 2021, Bryndís signed with Víkingur Reykjavík.

References

External links
 
 

1991 births
Living people
Bryndis Lara Hrafnkelsdottir
Bryndis Lara Hrafnkelsdottir
Bryndis Lara Hrafnkelsdottir
Bryndis Lara Hrafnkelsdottir
Bryndis Lara Hrafnkelsdottir
Bryndis Lara Hrafnkelsdottir
Bryndis Lara Hrafnkelsdottir
Women's association football goalkeepers